Neotamandua is an extinct genus of anteaters that lived in the Miocene to Pliocene in South America.

Taxonomy
Their fossils have been found in the Miocene Collón Cura Formation of Argentina, the Honda Group at La Venta in Colombia and the Pliocene Araucano Formation in Argentina. Its closest living relatives are the giant anteater (Myrmecophaga tridactyla) and tamanduas (genus Tamandua). The species Neotamandua borealis was suggested to be an ancestor of the giant anteater. Patterson (1992) suggested the Neotamandua fossils are very similar to Myrmecophaga, which would mean Neotamandua may be congeneric with Myrmecophaga.

References

Anteaters
Prehistoric placental genera
Miocene xenarthrans
Miocene mammals of South America
Pliocene mammals of South America
Chapadmalalan
Montehermosan
Huayquerian
Chasicoan
Mayoan
Laventan
Neogene Argentina
Neogene Colombia
Fossils of Argentina
Fossils of Colombia
Fossil taxa described in 1914